Tatyana Biryulina (born 16 July 1955, Tashkent) is a former javelin thrower from the Soviet Union, who set the world record and world's best year performance in 1980. She made her mark (70.08 m) at a pre-Olympic trial in Podolsk on 12 July 1980. She competed at the 1980 Summer Olympics in Moscow, finishing in sixth place (65.08 m), and ended her athletics career soon afterwards.

References

1955 births
Living people
Uzbekistani female javelin throwers
Soviet female javelin throwers
Athletes (track and field) at the 1980 Summer Olympics
Olympic athletes of the Soviet Union
Sportspeople from Tashkent